Rhys Thomas may refer to:

 Rhys ap Thomas (1449–1525), Welsh soldier and landholder 
 Rhys Thomas (juggler) (born 1963), American juggler
 Rhys Thomas (comedian) (born 1978), English comedian and actor
 Rhys Thomas (director) (born 1979), Welsh television director, Saturday Night Live
 Rhys M. Thomas (born 1982), Wales rugby union international prop 2007
 T. Rhys Thomas (born 1982), Wales rugby union international hooker 2007